The White Creek Wind Farm is an electricity generating wind farm facility in Klickitat County, Washington, United States. It is owned by Last Mile Electric Cooperative and began operations in 2007. The facility has a generating capacity of 205 megawatts.

See also

 List of wind farms in the United States
 List of power stations in the United States
 Wind power in Washington

References

External links
 https://web.archive.org/web/20121017233020/http://www.allbusiness.com/energy-utilities/utilities-industry-electric-power-power/5496827-1.html

Buildings and structures in Klickitat County, Washington
Wind farms in Washington (state)
Energy infrastructure completed in 2007